Applied Economic Perspectives and Policy (AEPP) is a peer-reviewed journal of applied economics and policy. Published four times per year, it is the one of two journals published by the Agricultural & Applied Economics Association (AAEA), along with the American Journal of Agricultural Economics (AJAE). Today is the leading journal in 'applied economics' with a 2020 impact factor of 4.083.

The purpose of AEPP is to analyze areas of current applied economic research in an effort to inform the policy-makers and decision makers; and to generate connections between sub-fields of agricultural and applied economics in order to focus future research and increase knowledge of those in the field about the impact of public policy.

History

Applied Economic Perspectives and Policy was first published as the Review of Agricultural Economics but changed its name to appeal to a wider audience in 2010. In addition to changing the name, the focus of the journal changed as well.

Editors

The current editors of the AEPP are Craig Gundersen from the Baylor University, Mindy Mallory from the Purdue University Purdue University and Daniel Petrolia from Mississippi State University.

References

External links
 Applied Economic Perspective and Policy Electronic Access through Oxford University Press
 AEPP Information from AAEA
 Agricultural & Applied Economics Association

Agricultural economics
Agricultural Economics, Journal of
Publications established in 1979